Jangamaheswara puram is a Suburb of Gurazala and is administered under the body of Gurazala Nagar panchayat, located in Gurazala Mandal, Palnadu District, Andhra Pradesh, India.

Schools 
 Jilla Parishath Unnatha Paatashala
 Mandala Parishath Prathamika Paatashala

Temples 
 Sri Palnati Venkateswara swami temple
 Sri Anjeneya swami Temple
 shivalayam
 Ramulavari gudi
 Alivelu mangaswami temple
 Thirupatamma Temple
 Poleramma Temple
 Veera Bramhendra Swami Temple
 Mallalamma Temple

References

Villages in Palnadu district